Dorcadion olympicum is a species of beetle in the family Cerambycidae. It was described by Kraatz in 1873. It is known from Turkey.

Subspecies
 Dorcadion olympicum convexum Breuning, 1943
 Dorcadion olympicum flavosuturale Krätschmer, 1987
 Dorcadion olympicum olympicum Kraatz, 1873

References

olympicum
Beetles described in 1873